PRINS (psoriasis associated RNA induced by stress) is a long non-coding RNA. Its expression is induced by stress, and it may have a protective role in cells exposed to stress. It is over-expressed in the skin of patients with psoriasis. It regulates G1P3, a gene encoding a protein with anti-apoptotic effects in keratinocytes. Overexpression of PRINS may contribute to psoriasis via the down-regulation of G1P3.

See also
 Long noncoding RNA

References

Further reading

Non-coding RNA